Prairie Ridge High School, often referred to as "PR," is the newest public high school in Community High School District 155 in Crystal Lake, Illinois, United States. The other three high school in the area include Crystal Lake Central, Crystal Lake South, and Cary-Grove. Prairie Ridge High school opened in 1997 to address the overpopulation of the three area high schools.

In addition to Crystal Lake's areas with the 60012 zip code, Prairie Ridge also accepts students from the Northern and Eastern areas of Crystal Lake with the 60014 zipcode, along with Prairie Grove, Oakwood Hills, Burtons Bridge, Ridgefield, and small portions of McHenry, Cary, and Bull Valley. Prior to opening its doors, the first graduating class of students was allowed to vote on the name, colors, and song for the new high school.  The district approved the name, and Prairie Ridge was born. As of the 2017–2018 school year, Prairie Ridge is the smallest high school in District 155.

Academics
The four year of graduation rate of Prairie Ridge for the 2017–18 school year was 84% which is below the district average of 95% and below the state average of 86%. For this graduating class, 80% of 362 students continued their education into either a community college or a 4-year university, and the most popular choices are McHenry County College (97), Iowa State University (12), Illinois State University (10), University of Iowa (10), and University of Illinois (9).

Prairie Ridge offers over 200 courses including Advanced Placement (AP), Project Lead the Way (PLTW), and Dual Credit. It offers PLTW courses in Introduction to Engineering Design, Principles of Engineering, Digital Electronics, and Engineering Design and Development. It also offers AP courses in English Language and Composition, English Literature and Composition, Studio Art Drawing/2D/3D, Art History, Computer Science Principles, Computer Science A, Calculus AB, Calculus BC, Statistics, Music Theory, Biology, Chemistry, Physics 1, Physics C, Environmental Science, U.S. History, European History, U.S. Government and Politics, Psychology, Microeconomics, Macroeconomics, Human Geography, French Language and Culture, German Language and Culture, Spanish Language and Culture, and Spanish Literature and Culture. In addition to these AP classes, Prairie Ridge offers 6 Dual Credit courses (Autos II, Computer Business Applications, Culinary Arts II Commercial, Good Boys Production Management, Marketing, Music Appreciation, and Spanish IV) in conjunction with McHenry County College and 1 Dual Credit course (Calculus III) in conjunction with the University of Illinois.

In the 2017–18 school year, Prairie Ridge students took 823 AP exams, and 647 of them resulted in college credit (needing a score of 3 or better) for a pass rate of 78.6%. For the same year, Prairie Ridge's SAT averages were 502.6 for the English Language Arts section and 560.6 for the Mathematics section, both of which are above the district average and state average. This also indicates a 50% proficiency rate in the English Language Arts section and a 51% rate of proficiency in Mathematics.

Athletics
Prairie Ridge competes in the Fox Valley Conference, which is a member of the Illinois High School Association (IHSA).  Both boys and girls swimming co-ops with Cary-Grove, CL Central, and CL South.

The baseball team won the 2007-08 IHSA State Championship. The Football team has 3 Class 6A state titles. One in 2011 with a 13–1 record. Back to Back state champs in 2016 and 2017 with a win streak of 28 games. The Boys' Soccer Team won the 1999–2000 IHSA State Championship. The Boys' Wrestling Team has had two state champions, David Vinton in 2009–2010, and Travis Piotrowski in 2015–2016.

Notable alumni
Jared Boll, Professional NHL hockey player with the Anaheim Ducks and formerly the Columbus Blue Jackets
Kevin Kaczmarski, Major League Baseball player with the New York Mets
Kristine Leahy (2005), American television host and sports reporter
Amy LePeilbet, 2012 Olympic Gold Medalist in Women's Soccer. Professional women's soccer player with the FC Kansas City and defender on the United States Women's National Soccer Team
Nick Martini, Major League Baseball player with the Chicago Cubs

References

External links
Prairie Ridge High School website
Prairie Ridge Girls Soccer Facebook Page

Public high schools in Illinois
Schools in McHenry County, Illinois
Educational institutions established in 1997
Crystal Lake, Illinois
1997 establishments in Illinois